Jonathan Clive Marks, Baron Marks of Henley-on-Thames,  (born 19 October 1952) is a British barrister and Liberal Democrat life peer in the House of Lords.

Biography 
Marks was educated at Harrow School and University College, Oxford.

He was called to the bar by Inner Temple in 1975. During the 1980s and early 1990s he was a visiting lecturer in advocacy at the University of Malaya, Kuala Lumpur, the University of Mauritius and Sri Lanka Law College. He was appointed QC in 1995 and continued in practice as a barrister. He has been a Freeman of the City of London since 1975 and is a member of the Worshipful Company of Pattenmakers.

Marks joined the Social Democratic Party on its foundation in 1981. He contested Weston-super-Mare at the 1983 general election and Falmouth and Camborne at the 1987 general election as well as Cornwall and Plymouth at the 1984 European election.

Following the creation of the Liberal Democrats, Marks served as a member of the party's Committee for England in 1988–9. He was a member of the Federal Policy Committee from 2004 to 2015 and was Chair of the Liberal Democrat Lawyers Association from 2001 to 2007.

On 19 November 2010, it was announced that Marks would be created a Life Peer. He was created Baron Marks of Henley-on-Thames, of Henley-on-Thames in the County of Oxfordshire, on 11 January 2011. Marks has served on the Defamation Bill Joint Committee and for three years on the House of Lords Delegated Powers and Regulatory Reform Committee. In 2012 he was appointed Liberal Democrat Spokesperson on Justice in the House of Lords and in 2015 was appointed the Liberal Democrat Shadow Justice Secretary. He continues in post as the Liberal Democrat Spokesperson on Justice and speaks regularly on justice issues. He is the sponsor of a private members' bill to give rights to cohabiting couples on relationship breakdown and intestacy, the Cohabitation Rights Bill. (Cohabitation Rights Bill [HL])

Personal life 

Marks is married to Medina Marks and has seven children. The family lives near Henley-on-Thames in Oxfordshire.

Arms

References

1952 births
Alumni of University College, Oxford
British King's Counsel
Liberal Democrats (UK) life peers
Living people
Members of the Inner Temple
People educated at Harrow School
Social Democratic Party (UK) parliamentary candidates
Life peers created by Elizabeth II